Dallas Keuchel (born January 1, 1988) is an American professional baseball pitcher who is currently a free agent. He has previously played in MLB for the Houston Astros, Atlanta Braves, Chicago White Sox, Arizona Diamondbacks, and Texas Rangers.

Keuchel attended the University of Arkansas, where he played baseball for the Arkansas Razorbacks. Keuchel made his MLB debut in 2012. In 2014, he was awarded both the Gold Glove Award and the Fielding Bible Award. Keuchel was named the starting pitcher for the American League in the 2015 MLB All-Star Game. Following the 2015 season, he won the American League Cy Young Award along with his second Gold Glove and Fielding Bible Awards. Keuchel was a member of the World Series champion 2017 Houston Astros. He played for the Atlanta Braves in 2019 and signed a three-year contract with the Chicago White Sox before the 2020 season. The White Sox designated Keuchel for assignment and subsequently released him in May 2022. Later in the year he was signed first by the Arizona Diamondbacks and then by the Texas Rangers, both of which later designated him for assignment. He is a two-time All-Star and a five-time Gold Glove winner.

Amateur career

Keuchel attended Bishop Kelley High School in Tulsa, Oklahoma, where he led the baseball team to the state championship.

Keuchel then attended the University of Arkansas, where he played college baseball for the Arkansas Razorbacks baseball team. He registered a 5.88 earned run average (ERA) as a freshman, a 4.58 ERA as a sophomore, and a 3.92 ERA as a junior. In 2007 and 2008, he played collegiate summer baseball for the Wareham Gatemen of the Cape Cod Baseball League and was a league all-star in 2008.

During the 2009 season, Keuchel led the Razorbacks as the Friday-night ace. The final regular season series was against Drew Pomeranz and #9 Ole Miss at Baum Stadium. The Razorbacks committed four errors in Keuchel's last regular season start, and he was tagged with the loss, ending the regular season with a 7–3 record. However, Keuchel led the Arkansas pitching staff to the 2009 College World Series in Omaha. Arkansas finished the CWS 3rd nationally that season.

Professional career

Minor leagues
After his junior year at Arkansas, the Houston Astros selected Keuchel in the seventh round of the 2009 Major League Baseball (MLB) draft. He signed with the Astros and began his professional career with the Tri-City ValleyCats of the Class A-Short Season New York–Penn League, where he had a 2.70 ERA. He began the 2010 season with the Lancaster JetHawks of the Class A-Advanced California League. After posting a 3.36 ERA, the Astros promoted him to the Corpus Christi Hooks of the Class AA Texas League in July, where he had a 4.70 ERA for the remainder of the season. He began the 2011 season with Corpus Christi, and after pitching to a 3.17 ERA, received a promotion to the Oklahoma City RedHawks of the Class AAA Pacific Coast League, where he struggled with a 7.50 ERA.

Houston Astros

2012–14

Keuchel began the 2012 season with Oklahoma City. Keuchel made his MLB debut on June 17, 2012 against the Texas Rangers. He threw a complete game in his second start. Keuchel finished the 2012 season with a 5.27 ERA in 16 games started, while allowing more walks (39) than strikeouts (38). He pitched to a 5.15 ERA in the 2013 season.

In 2014, Keuchel had a 9–5 win–loss record and a 3.20 ERA at the All-Star break, and was a finalist for the final American League (AL) roster spot in the 2014 MLB All-Star Game. He finished the season with a 12–9 record and a 2.93 ERA. For his defense, Keuchel won both the Gold Glove Award and Fielding Bible Award.

2015: Cy Young Award

In April 2015, Keuchel pitched to a 3–0 record and a 0.73 ERA in five games started. He was named the AL's Pitcher of the Month for April 2015. He was honored as the AL Pitcher of the Month for May 2015, in which he pitched to a 4–1 record and a 2.62 ERA in six starts. Keuchel was selected for the AL roster in the 2015 MLB All-Star Game, and was chosen as the AL's starting pitcher. He won his third AL Pitcher of the Month Award for August, after pitching to a 4–1 record and a 1.94 ERA in six starts. Keuchel finished the 2015 season with a 15–0 record at Minute Maid Park, becoming the first pitcher in MLB history to finish with an undefeated record at home with at least 14 wins. 

His overall record for the year was 20–8, and he had a 2.48 ERA and 216 strikeouts. Among major league pitchers, he gave up the lowest percentage of hard-hit balls (21.3%). He threw 3,492 pitches, more than any other major league pitcher.

Keuchel started and won the 2015 American League Wild Card Game on three days' rest. On October 11, he followed up by beating the Kansas City Royals, 4–2, in Game 3 of the AL Divisional Series, to move the Astros within one game of advancing. In Game 5, Keuchel was brought in for a relief appearance on just two days of rest in the 8th inning, but he surrendered a three-run home run as the Royals extended their lead to 7–2, which they held on to win the game and the series. Following the season, Keuchel won the Cy Young Award, the Gold Glove Award, the Fielding Bible Award, and the Warren Spahn Award, given to the best left-handed pitcher in MLB. Keuchel became the third Astro to win a Cy Young Award.

2016
In 2016, Keuchel won another Gold Glove Award, but he went 9–12 with a 4.55 ERA and a 1.286 WHIP in 26 games pitched and 168 innings. In September, Keuchel missed starts due to inflammation in his left shoulder. He later admitted that he had pitched through shoulder discomfort throughout the 2016 season.

2017
Keuchel began the 2017 season by winning his fourth career AL Pitcher of the Month Award in April, after posting a 5–0 W–L and 1.21 ERA over six starts. He allowed six runs over  IP. He became the first Astros pitcher to win four; J. R. Richard was the other Astros pitcher who had won three. He proceeded to start the season with a 7–0 record and a 1.84 ERA; however, on May 20, 2017, he was placed on the 10-day disabled list due to a pinched nerve in his neck. On June 8, 2017, Keuchel was again placed on the disabled list due to continuing neck woes. He was selected to play in the All-Star Game, held at Marlins Park in Miami. It was his second career selection. 

Keuchel finished 2017 making 23 starts with a 14–5 record and a 2.90 ERA. The Astros won the American League West division with a 101–61 record to reach the postseason for the second time in three seasons. In the 2017 American League Division Series, the Astros faced the Boston Red Sox, and Keuchel started Game 2. He pitched  innings while allowing one run on three hits with seven strikeouts as Houston won 8–2 before winning the series two games later. 

Keuchel started Game 1 of the 2017 American League Championship Series against the New York Yankees, which resulted in seven scoreless innings while allowing just four hits with ten strikeouts in a 2–1 victory. He started Game 5 five days later, but he lasted just  innings while allowing four runs on seven hits in a 5–0 loss.  However, the Astros won the pennant a couple of days later to advance to their first World Series in twelve years. 

In the 2017 World Series, Keuchel was tapped to start Game 1; he allowed three runs on six hits in  innings of work that saw him take the loss in a 3–1 result. He pitched once more in Game 5, which saw him last just  innings and allow four runs on five hits, but the Astros battled in a classic back-and-forth game that saw them win 13–12 in ten innings. The Astros won the series days later to give Keuchel a World Series ring; he went 2–2 in the 2017 postseason. 

Three years later, it was revealed in the Houston Astros sign stealing scandal that the Astros had broken MLB rules during the 2017 season. Keuchel subsequently apologized for his role in the scandal.

2018 
In 2018, Keuchel compiled a 12–11 record with a 3.74 ERA in a career-high 34 starts. He had the highest ground ball percentage among major league pitchers (53.7%), and the lowest fly ball percentage (24.4%). He also won his fourth Gold Glove. He became a free agent after the 2018 season.

Atlanta Braves (2019)
On June 7, 2019, Keuchel signed a one-year contract with the Atlanta Braves worth $13 million. He made his first start on June 21. Over 19 starts for the year, Keuchel went 8–8 with a 3.75 ERA, striking out 91 over  innings.

Chicago White Sox (2020–2022)
On December 30, 2019, the Chicago White Sox signed Keuchel to a three-year, $55.5 million contract. He made his White Sox debut on July 25, 2020, picking up a win over the Minnesota Twins. In the 2020 season, he was 6–2 with a 1.99 ERA. He led the AL in fewest home runs per 9 IP (0.284), and in fewest strikeouts per nine innings (6.0). 

Keuchel struggled in 2021, compiling a 9–9 record and an ERA of 5.28 in 30 starts. He gave up 189 hits and 105 runs in 162 innings and struck out 95 batters, striking out fewer batters per 9 innings (5.28) than any other pitcher in the major leagues. However, he did receive his fifth Gold Glove Award. During the second half of the season, his ERA was 6.82 and he struggled with a back injury. 

In 2022, Keuchel had a 7.88 ERA for the White Sox in eight games started. On May 28, the White Sox designated Keuchel for assignment. He was released on May 30.

Arizona Diamondbacks (2022)
Keuchel signed a minor league contract with the Arizona Diamondbacks on June 6, 2022. Keuchel started two games for the Arizona Complex League Diamondbacks before the Diamondbacks promoted him to the major leagues on June 26. On July 20, 2022, the Diamondbacks designated him for assignment, clearing waivers and making him a free agent. In his short span with Arizona, Keuchel compiled a 9.68 ERA for the team in four games started.

Texas Rangers (2022)
On July 25, 2022, Keuchel signed a minor league contract with the Texas Rangers. He was added to the Rangers' taxi squad on August 26. Keuchel made his Rangers debut on August 27, 2022, giving up 7 earned runs over 5.1 innings pitched in a blowout 11-2 loss to the Detroit Tigers. He was designated for assignment after posting a 12.60 ERA across 10 innings.

Pitching style
Keuchel throws five pitches: a four-seam fastball averaging , a sinker averaging , a cut fastball averaging , a slider averaging , and a changeup averaging . He had learned a slurve while in high school, which he did not use in college, as he relied on his sinker and changeup. Needing a breaking ball when he became a professional, he learned to throw a curveball. He did not succeed with the curveball in the major leagues, and he developed a slider, which helped his results. Keuchel's sinker and slider both induce more ground balls than average across the league.

See also

 Houston Astros award winners and league leaders
 List of Chicago White Sox award winners and league leaders
 List of Major League Baseball annual shutout leaders
 List of people from Tulsa, Oklahoma
 List of University of Arkansas people
 List of World Series starting pitchers

Personal life
Keuchel is the son of Dennis and Teresa Keuchel. He has an older sister, Krista. On March 9, 2021, Keuchel got engaged to MLB/NHL Network host, Kelly Nash. Keuchel and Nash were married on January 22, 2022.

After signing with the White Sox, Keuchel purchased a $2 million home in the Lake View neighborhood of Chicago. Keuchel is Catholic.

References

External links

 

1988 births
Living people
Houston Astros players
Atlanta Braves players
Chicago White Sox players
Arizona Diamondbacks players
Texas Rangers players
Arkansas Razorbacks baseball players
Wareham Gatemen players
Tri-City ValleyCats players
Lancaster JetHawks players
Corpus Christi Hooks players
Oklahoma City RedHawks players
Salt River Rafters players
Rome Braves players
Mississippi Braves players
Arizona Complex League Diamondbacks players
Major League Baseball pitchers
American League All-Stars
American League wins champions
Cy Young Award winners
Gold Glove Award winners
Sportspeople from Tulsa, Oklahoma
Baseball players from Oklahoma